The Grays River Covered Bridge is a one-lane covered bridge over the Grays River in western Wahkiakum County, Washington. It is the only covered bridge still in use as a public highway in Washington State. The bridge was added to the National Register of Historic Places in 1971.

History
The bridge was built in 1905 in order to allow horse and wagon agricultural traffic to cross the river. Hans P. Ahlberg, whose dairy farm spanned both sides of the river, was instrumental in getting county commissioners to authorize the project, which was built on his property by the Ferguson & Huston company of Astoria, Oregon. The bridge was covered three years later in 1908 to preserve the expensive wooden trusses from the ravages of the area rains. The roof of the covered bridge was originally built of "board and batten cedar siding with a capped tin roof."

The bridge received a major restoration and reconstruction in 1988. In disrepair and at risk of being torn down, residents worked to raise funds for restoration. Reconstruction was completed by Dulin Construction of Centralia, Washington, for a cost of $295,980.00. The new bridge included steel beams some of which received a wood veneer to maintain the bridge's historic appearance. On September 30, 1989, the bridge was rededicated to public use, with author, granger, and Grays River resident Robert Michael Pyle serving as master of ceremonies.

Engineering
Cedar shingles cover the exterior.

Management
The bridge is the centerpiece of Ahlberg Park, which has been managed by the Grays River Grange since 2011 and is the site of an annual Covered Bridge Festival.

See also
List of bridges documented by the Historic American Engineering Record in Washington (state)

References

External links

 by Robin Bruce, 1991
Covered bridge over the Grays River, 1967 (Werner Leggenhager) University of Washington Digital Collection

Bridges completed in 1905
Road bridges on the National Register of Historic Places in Washington (state)
Wooden bridges in Washington (state)
Transportation buildings and structures in Wahkiakum County, Washington
Tourist attractions in Wahkiakum County, Washington
Historic American Engineering Record in Washington (state)
National Register of Historic Places in Wahkiakum County, Washington
Covered bridges on the National Register of Historic Places in Washington (state)
1905 establishments in Washington (state)